Kimmer Coppejans was the defending champion but lost in the first round to Tallon Griekspoor.

Calvin Hemery won the title after defeating Pedro Sousa 6–3, 6–4 in the final.

Seeds

Draw

Finals

Top half

Bottom half

References
Main Draw
Qualifying Draw

Tampere Open - Men's Singles
2017 Men's Singles